Montagu is an English surname of Old French origin, a form of Montague.  One notable family with this surname is the House of Montagu, who include the Earls of Sandwich. Notable people with the surname include:

Lady Agneta Harriet Montagu (1838–1919), English aristocrat and bridesmaid to Alexandra of Denmark
Alberta Montagu, Countess of Sandwich (1877–1951), American wife of the 9th Earl of Sandwich
Alexander Montagu, 13th Duke of Manchester (b. 1962), the current Duke of Manchester
Ashley Montagu (1905–1999), anthropologist
Charles Montagu (disambiguation), several persons
David Montagu, 4th Baron Swaythling (1928–1998), British peer and industrialist
Edward Montagu (disambiguation), several persons
Edward Montagu, 1st Baron Montagu (died 1361), English peer
Sir Edward Montagu (judge) (c.1485–1556/1557), English lawyer and judge
Sir Edward Montagu of Boughton (1532–1601/1602) of Boughton House
Edward Montagu, 1st Baron Montagu of Boughton (1560–1644), son of the above
Edward Montagu, 2nd Earl of Manchester (1602–1671)
Edward Montagu, 1st Earl of Sandwich (1625–1672), English landowner, military officer and politician
Edward Montagu, 2nd Earl of Sandwich (1648–1688)
Edward Montagu, 2nd Baron Montagu of Boughton (1616–1684), Baron Montagu of Boughton House
Edward Montagu (died 1665) (c. 1636–1665), English MP for Sandwich
Edward Montagu (1649–1690), English MP for Northamptonshire and Seaford
Edward Montagu (1672–1710), English MP for Chippenham
Edward Montagu, Viscount Hinchingbrooke (1692–1722)
Edward Montagu, 3rd Earl of Sandwich (1670–1729)
Edward Montagu (died 1738) (after 1684–1738), British MP for Northampton
Edward Montagu (1692–1776), British MP for Huntingdon
Edward Wortley Montagu (traveller) (1713–1776), English author and traveller
Sir Edward Wortley Montagu (diplomat) (1678–1761), British diplomat
Edward Hussey-Montagu, 1st Earl Beaulieu (1721–1802), British peer and politician
Edward Montagu (Indian Army officer) (1755–1799)
Edward Montagu, 8th Earl of Sandwich (1839–1916), Conservative politician and author (known as Viscount Hinchingbrooke until 1884)
Edward Douglas-Scott-Montagu, 3rd Baron Montagu of Beaulieu (1926–2015), English politician
Edwin Montagu (1879–1924), British Liberal politician
Elizabeth Montagu (1718–1800), British bluestocking
Lady Elizabeth Montagu (1917–2006), British novelist and nurse
Ewen Montagu (1901–1985), British judge, writer and Naval intelligence officer
Felicity Montagu (b. 1960), British actress
Frederick Montagu (1733–1800), British politician
George Montagu, 4th Duke of Manchester (1737–1788), British politician and diplomat
George Montagu (naturalist) (1753–1815), British naturalist
George Montagu (Royal Navy officer) (1750–1829)
Georgina Montagu, British journalist and author
Heneage Montagu (1675–1698), younger son of Robert Montagu, 3rd Earl of Manchester
Henry Montagu, 1st Earl of Manchester (c. 1563 – 1642), English judge, politician and peer
Henry Neville Montagu (c. 1823–1901), teacher and journalist in Australia
James Montagu (judge) (1666–1723), English barrister, and judge
James Montagu (Royal Navy officer) (1752–1794)
Jennifer Montagu (born 1931), British art historian
John Montagu (disambiguation), several persons
 John Montagu, 1st Baron Montagu (–), English nobleman
 John Montagu, 3rd Earl of Salisbury (–1400), English nobleman
 John Montagu (Trinity) (–1728), Master of Trinity College, Cambridge, 1683–1699
 John Montagu, 2nd Duke of Montagu (1690–1749), British peer
 John Montagu, 4th Earl of Sandwich (1718–1792), British statesman, claimed inventor of the sandwich
 John Montagu (Royal Navy officer) (1719–1795), Governor for Newfoundland and Labrador
 John Montagu, Marquess of Monthermer (1735–1770), British peer
 John Montagu, 5th Earl of Sandwich (1744–1814), British peer and Tory politician
 John Montagu (colonial secretary) (1797–1853), British army officer and Colonial Secretary
 John Montagu, 7th Earl of Sandwich (1811–1884), British peer and Conservative politician
 John Montagu, 11th Earl of Sandwich (born 1943), British entrepreneur and politician
Julie Montagu, Viscountess Hinchingbrooke (born 1972), American entrepreneur, yoga instructor, blogger, writer and reality television star
Lady Mary Faith Montagu (1911–1983), British aristocrat
Lady Mary Wortley Montagu (1689–1762), British aristocrat and writer
Lily Montagu (1873–1963), first woman to play a major role in Reform Judaism
Ralph Montagu, 1st Duke of Montagu (1638–1709), English courtier and diplomat
Bishop Richard Montagu (1577–1641), English cleric and writer 
Lord Robert Montagu (1825–1902), British Conservative politician and member of the Privy Council
Louis Montagu, 2nd Baron Swaythling (1869–1927), British financier and Jewish anti-Zionist
Nicholas Montagu (b. 1944), British civil servant
Robert Montagu (disambiguation), several people
Samuel Montagu, 1st Baron Swaythling (1832–1911), British banker, philanthropist and Liberal politician

See also
Montague (surname)
Montague (given name)

English-language surnames